The General is a 1926 American silent film released by United Artists. It was inspired by the Great Locomotive Chase, a true story of an event that occurred during the American Civil War. The story was adapted from the 1889 memoir The Great Locomotive Chase by William Pittenger. The film stars Buster Keaton who co-directed it with Clyde Bruckman.

At the time of its initial release, The General, an action-adventure-comedy made toward the end of the silent era, was not well received by critics and audiences, resulting in mediocre box office returns (about half a million dollars domestically, and approximately one million worldwide). Because of its then-huge budget ($750,000 supplied by Metro chief Joseph Schenck) and failure to turn a significant profit, Keaton lost his independence as a filmmaker and was forced into a restrictive deal with Metro-Goldwyn-Mayer.

In 1954 the film entered the public domain in the United States because its claimant did not renew its copyright registration in the 28th year after publication.

The General has since been reevaluated, and is now often ranked among the greatest American films ever made. In 1989, it was selected by the Library of Congress to be included in the first class of films for preservation in the United States National Film Registry for being "culturally, historically, or aesthetically significant".

Plot 

When Western & Atlantic Railroad train engineer Johnnie Gray arrives in Marietta, Georgia, he visits the home of Annabelle Lee, one of the two loves of his life, the other being his locomotive, The General. News arrives that the American Civil War has broken out, and Annabelle's brother and father rush to enlist in the Confederate Army. To please Annabelle, Johnnie hurries to be first in line to enlist, but is rejected because he is more valuable as an engineer, although he is not told that reason. On leaving, he runs into Annabelle's father and brother, who beckon to him to join them in line, but he walks away, leaving them with the impression that he does not want to enlist. Annabelle informs Johnnie that she will not speak to him again until he is in uniform.

A year passes, and Annabelle receives word that her father has been wounded. She travels north on the W&ARR to see him, with The General pulling the train. When it makes a stop, the passengers and crew detrain for a quick meal. As previously planned, Union spies led by Captain Anderson use the opportunity to steal the train. Anderson's objective is to burn all the railroad bridges he passes, thus preventing reinforcement and resupply of the Confederate army. Annabelle, who returned to a baggage car, becomes an inadvertent prisoner of the raiders.

Johnnie gives chase, first on foot, then by handcar and boneshaker bicycle, before reaching the station at Kingston. He alerts the army detachment there, which boards another train to give chase, with Johnnie manning the locomotive the Texas. However, the flatcars are not hooked up to the engine and the troops are left behind. By the time Johnnie realizes he is alone, it is too late to turn back.

The Union agents try various methods to shake their pursuer, including disconnecting their trailing car and dropping railroad ties on the tracks. As the chase continues northward, the Confederate Army of Tennessee is ordered to retreat and the Northern army advances in its wake. Johnnie finally notices he is now behind Union lines, and the hijackers see that Johnnie is by himself. Johnnie stops the Texas and runs into the forest to hide just as a downpour develops.

At nightfall, Johnnie climbs through the window of a house to steal some food, but hides underneath a table when some Union officers enter. He overhears their plan for a surprise attack and that the Rock River Bridge is essential for their supporting supply trains. He then sees Annabelle brought in; she is taken to a room under guard while they decide what to do with her. Johnnie manages to knock out both guards and free Annabelle. They escape into the rainy woods.

As day breaks, Johnnie and Annabelle find themselves near a railway station where Union soldiers and equipment are being organized for the attack. Seeing The General, Johnnie devises a plan to warn the South. After sneaking Annabelle onto a boxcar, Johnnie steals his engine back. Two Union trains, including the Texas, set out after the pair, while the Union attack is launched. In a reversal of the first chase, Johnnie now has to fend off his pursuers. Finally, he starts a fire behind The General in the center of the Rock River Bridge, to cut off the Union's important supply line.

Reaching friendly lines, Johnnie warns the Confederate commander of the impending attack and their forces rush to meet the enemy. Meanwhile, Annabelle is reunited with her convalescing father. The pursuing Texas drives onto the burning bridge, which collapses. When Union soldiers try to ford the river, Confederate fire drives them back.

Afterward, Johnnie returns to his locomotive to find the Union officer whom he had knocked out in escaping earlier has now regained consciousness. He takes the officer prisoner and is spotted by the Confederate general. As a reward for his bravery, he is commissioned a lieutenant and given the captured officer's sword.

Returning to The General with Annabelle, he tries to kiss her, but has to repeatedly return the salutes of troops walking past. Johnnie finally uses his left hand to embrace Annabelle while using his right to salute the passing soldiers.

Cast 
 Buster Keaton as Johnnie Gray
 Marion Mack as Annabelle Lee
 Glen Cavender as Union Captain Anderson
 Jim Farley as General Thatcher
 Frederick Vroom as a Confederate general
 Charles Smith as Annabelle's father
 Frank Barnes as Annabelle's brother
 Joe Keaton as a Union general
 Mike Donlin as a Union general
 Tom Nawn as a Union general

Production 

In early 1926, Keaton's collaborator Clyde Bruckman told him about William Pittenger's 1889 memoir The Great Locomotive Chase about the 1862 Great Locomotive Chase. Keaton was a huge fan of trains and had read the book. Although it was written from the Union Army perspective, Keaton did not believe that the audience would accept Confederates as villains and changed the story's point of view. Keaton looked into shooting the film in the area where the original events took place, and attempted to authorize a lease agreement for the real-life General. At that time, the locomotive was on display at Chattanooga Union Station. The Nashville, Chattanooga and St. Louis Railway, who had entitlement on the engine, denied Keaton's request when they realized the film was going to be a comedy.

In April 1926, Keaton's location manager, Burt Jackson, found an area in Oregon with old-fashioned railroads which he ascertained to be more authentic in terms of period setting for the film. He also discovered that the Oregon, Pacific and Eastern Railway owned two vintage locomotives operating in lumber service that looked the part and purchased them for the production. He later bought a third locomotive in Oregon to portray the Texas for the purpose of using it in the iconic bridge collapse stunt. Producer Joseph Schenck was excited about the film and gave Keaton a budget of $400,000. Keaton spent weeks working on the script and preparing for elaborate pyrotechnical shots. He also grew his hair long for the film. He hired Sennett Bathing Beauties actress Marion Mack for the female lead role.

The cast and crew arrived in Cottage Grove, Oregon, on May 27, 1926, with 18 freight cars full of Civil War-era cannons, rebuilt passenger cars, stagecoaches, houses, wagons and laborers. The crew stayed at the Bartell Hotel in nearby Eugene and brought three 35 mm cameras with them from Los Angeles. On May 31, set construction began with the materials, and regular train service in Cottage Grove ceased until the end of production. One third of the film's budget was spent in Cottage Grove, and 1,500 locals were hired.

Filming began on June 8. At first, Keaton completely ignored Mack on set. She said that "Buster just stuck to the job and to his little clique, and that was all" and that the crew "stopped the train when they saw a place to play baseball." Keaton eventually came to like Mack during production, often playing practical jokes on her. The atmosphere on set was lighthearted, and every Sunday the cast and crew played baseball with local residents, who often said that Keaton could have been a professional player.

According to a United Artists press release at the time, the film had 3,000 people on its payroll and cost $400 an hour to make. Entertainment trade papers reported rumors that the film's budget had grown to between $500,000 and $1 million, and that Keaton was out of control, building real bridges and having dams constructed to change the depths of rivers. Producer Schenck was angry at Keaton over the growing costs. There were also numerous on-set accidents that contributed to the growing budget. This included Keaton being knocked unconscious; an assistant director being shot in the face with a blank cartridge; a train wheel running over a brakeman's foot, resulting in a $2,900 lawsuit; and the train's wood-burning engine causing numerous fires. The fires often spread to forests and farmers' haystacks, which cost the production $25 per burnt stack.

On July 23, Keaton shot the climactic train wreck scene in the conifer forest near Cottage Grove. The town declared a local holiday so that everyone could watch the spectacle. Between three and four thousand local residents showed up, including 500 extras from the Oregon National Guard. (Elsewhere in the film, the Oregon National Guard members appear dressed as both Union and Confederate soldiers who cross the landscape in the background of the train tracks). Keaton used six cameras for the train wreck scene, which began four hours late and required several lengthy trial runs. The train wreck of the "Texas" shot cost $42,000, the most expensive single shot in silent-film history. The production company left the wreckage in the riverbed. The locomotive became a minor tourist attraction for nearly twenty years, until it was salvaged in 1944–45 for scrap during World War II.

Another fire broke out during the filming of a large fight scene, which not only cost the production $50,000, but also forced Keaton and the crew to return to Los Angeles on August 6 due to excessive smoke. Heavy rains finally cleared the smoke in late August and production resumed. Shooting concluded on September 18. Keaton had shot 200,000 feet of film and began a lengthy editing process for a late December release date.

Keaton performed many dangerous physical stunts on and around the moving train, including jumping from the engine to a tender to a boxcar, and running along the roofs of the railcars. One of the most dangerous stunts involved him pulling a railroad tie out from being lodged into the track, with the train steadily approaching, then sitting on the cow-catcher of the slow-moving train while carrying the tie, then tossing it at another tie to dislodge it from the tracks; had he either failed to pull out the first tie on time, or mistimed the throw to the second tie, the locomotive could have derailed and Keaton could have been injured or killed.

Another dangerous stunt involved him sitting on one of the coupling rods connecting the drivers of the locomotive; had the locomotive suffered a wheelspin, Keaton might have been thrown from the rod and injured or killed. Shot in one take, the scene shows the train starting gently and gradually picking up speed as it enters a shed, while Keaton's character Johnnie Gray, distracted and heartbroken, is oblivious.

In the cast credits, Keaton's name/character is listed last.

Release and initial reception 
The General premiered on December 31, 1926, in two small theaters in Tokyo, Japan. It was scheduled to have its US premiere at the prestigious Capitol Theatre in New York City on January 22, 1927, but was delayed for several weeks due to the enormous hit Flesh and the Devil playing at the Capitol. It finally premiered on February 5, with the engine bell from the real General train on display in the lobby to promote it. It played at the Capitol for one week, making $50,992, considered average box-office. With a final budget of $750,000, it made $474,264 in the US.

On its initial release, the film largely failed to please the critics. Variety reported of a theater in which it played, "After four weeks of record business with Flesh and the Devil, looks as though it were virtually going to starve to death this week". It went on to say The General was "far from funny" and that it was "a flop". The New York Times reviewer Mordaunt Hall stated, "The production itself is singularly well mounted, but the fun is not exactly plentiful", and "This is by no means so good as Mr. Keaton's previous efforts." The Los Angeles Times reported that the picture was "neither straight comedy nor is it altogether thrilling drama" . . . "drags terribly with a long and tiresome chase of one engine by another". A review from Motion Picture Classic called it "a mild Civil War comedy, not up to Keaton's best standards." A review from the New York Herald Tribune called it "long and tedious—the least-funny thing Buster Keaton has ever done." Writer Robert E. Sherwood wrote, "Someone should have told Buster Keaton that it is difficult to derive laughter from the sight of men being killed in battle." One good review came from the Brooklyn Eagle.

Legacy 

In 1963, Keaton said, "I was more proud of that picture than any I ever made. Because I took an actual happening out of the... history books, and I told the story in detail too". Following changes in taste and critical reevaluation of Keaton's work, later audiences and critics have come to agree with him, and The General is now considered a major classic of the silent era. David Robinson wrote, "Every shot has the authenticity and the unassumingly correct composition of a Mathew Brady Civil War photograph." Raymond Durgnat wrote, "Perhaps The General is the most beautiful [film], with its spare, grey photography, its eye for the racy, lunging lines of the great locomotives, with their prow-like cowcatchers, with its beautifully sustained movement." In 2015, leftist magazine Jacobin called the film a "comic masterpiece" but denounced it for "promoting" the Lost Cause of the Confederacy.

In 1954 the film entered the public domain in the United States because its claimant did not renew its copyright registration in the 28th year after publication.

In 1989, The General was selected for preservation in the United States National Film Registry by the Library of Congress as "culturally, historically, or aesthetically significant". It was the Registry's initial year; some of the other films chosen were The Best Years of Our Lives, Casablanca, Citizen Kane, Gone with the Wind, Singin' in the Rain, Snow White and the Seven Dwarfs, Star Wars, Sunset Boulevard, and The Wizard of Oz.

In the decennial Sight & Sound poll of the greatest films ever made, international critics ranked The General #8 in 1972 and #10 in 1982. It ranked #34 in critic's poll in 2012 and 75th in the directors' poll. In 2002, critic Roger Ebert listed it on his Top 10 and his list The Great Movies. Dave Whitaker of DavesMovieDatabase, a film aggregator site that combines other lists with box-office, ratings and awards, lists The General as the 99th-greatest movie of all time, the 21st-greatest comedy, and the 3rd-greatest silent.

A mural was painted on a building in Cottage Grove, OR commemorating the film. David Thomson has speculated it is "the only memorial in the United States to Buster Keaton."

U.S. film distributor Kino International released the film on Blu-ray Disc in November 2009, the first American release of a silent feature film for the high-definition video medium. The Blu-ray edition replicates the extra features of Kino's 2008 "The Ultimate 2-Disc Edition" on DVD, including the choice of three different orchestral scores.

The film was recognized by American Film Institute in these lists:
 1998: AFI's 100 Years...100 Movies – Nominated
 2000: AFI's 100 Years...100 Laughs – #18
 2001: AFI's 100 Years...100 Thrills – Nominated
 2003: AFI's 100 Years...100 Heroes & Villains:
 Johnnie Gray – Nominated Hero
 2006: AFI's 100 Years...100 Cheers – Nominated
 2007: AFI's 100 Years...100 Movies (10th Anniversary Edition) – #18

Versions 

In 1953, a new version of the film was created by film distributor and collector Raymond Rohauer, reedited with an introduction and music. As of 2013 this version is under copyright, as Rohauer filed a copyright registration in 1953 and renewed it in 1983.

In 1987, Carl Davis composed a score for the film, which was later used with a 4K restoration of the film in 2019.

In 2016 or 2017, an original score was commissioned to celebrate the 90th anniversaries of The General and Portland, Oregon's Hollywood Theater. The film subsequently toured Oregon. After its showing in Cottage Grove, the president of the National Film Archives offered the movie's master print for production of the DVD. It is currently in production, and a worldwide tour is planned to accompany the DVD release.

See also 
 Buster Keaton filmography
 The Great Locomotive Chase, a 1956 film

References

Citations

Sources 
  
 Orson Welles interview, from the Kino November 10, 2009 Blu-ray edition of The General
 Daring and Suffering: A History of the Great Railway Adventure by Lieutenant William Pittenger

Bibliography

External links 

 
 
 
 
 
 
 The General at the International Buster Keaton Society
 Tour of The General filming locations (Archived)
 The General essay by Daniel Eagan in America's Film Legacy: The Authoritative Guide to the Landmark Movies in the National Film Registry, A&C Black, 2010 , pages 124-126

1926 films
1920s action comedy films
1920s chase films
American Civil War films
American action comedy films
American silent feature films
American black-and-white films
American chase films
Films directed by Buster Keaton
Films directed by Clyde Bruckman
Films set in 1861
Films set in Georgia (U.S. state)
Films set in Tennessee
Films shot in Oregon
Films set on trains
United Artists films
United States National Film Registry films
Articles containing video clips
Films produced by Joseph M. Schenck
Films with screenplays by Buster Keaton
Surviving American silent films
Great Locomotive Chase
1927 comedy films
1927 films
1926 comedy films
Lost Cause of the Confederacy
1920s English-language films
1920s American films
Silent American comedy films
Silent thriller films
Military humor in film